Track significance, in high energy collision experiments, is defined as the ratio between the impact parameter of a track (distance from the primary vertex) and the estimated error in it.

Formula

References

Experimental particle physics